Labergement-du-Navois is a former commune in the Doubs département in the Bourgogne-Franche-Comté region in eastern France. On 1 January 2017, it was merged into the commune Levier.

Geography
From the Fly at 866 m, there are views of the Alps.

History
As its name implies (abergement means lodging), the town grew up as a stop on the road to Italy during the reign of Louis XV and after Franche-Comté became part of France.

Population

Inhabitants of the commune are called Loups (wolves).

See also
 Communes of the Doubs department

References

External links

 Labergement-du-Navois on the intercommunal Web site of the department 

Former communes of Doubs